is a football club based in Musashino, Tokyo, Japan. They currently play in the Japan Football League, Japan's fourth tier of league football. Their team colour is blue and yellow.

History 
The club was founded as a football club of Yokogawa Electric Corporation in 1939. In 1978, the club achieved their first promotion to the Kanto Regional League. Despite experiencing the relegation to the Tokyo Prefecture League twice, they were determined to bounce back and gained the promotion to the Japan Football League in 1999. Although the club still have strong association with Yokogawa Electric, they left the nest in 2003 and started the new life as a non-corporation club under the name Yokogawa Musashino until 2015. The club was renamed Tokyo Musashino City in January 2016.

In February 2021, the club renamed its official name to Tokyo Musashino United Football Club.

Stadiums 
Their home ground is Musashino Municipal Athletic Stadium, but they also play some of their home games at Ajinomoto Stadium, Ajinomoto Stadium sub ground, Edogawa Stadium, and Nishigaoka Soccer Stadium.

League & cup record 

Key

Honours 
 Kanto Soccer League Champions 
1994, 1997, 1998
 Japanese Regional Champion
1998
 Shakaijin Cup
1993, 1997

Current squad 
As of 9 March 2023.

Coaching staff 
For the 2023 season.

Managerial history

References

External links 
 

 
Football clubs in Japan
Association football clubs established in 1939
Football clubs in Tokyo
1939 establishments in Japan
Japan Football League clubs